Mikić is a Serbian and Croatian surname. It may be written without diacritics as Mikic or transcribed as Mikich. The surname may refer to:

 Borislav Mikić, Bosnian football player
 Jovan Mikić Spartak, Serbian jumper
 Krešimir Mikić, Croatian actor
 Mihael Mikić, Croatian football player
 Minya Mikic, Italian artist of Serbian descent
 Mirko Mikić, Bosnian handball player
 Nikola Mikić, Serbian football player
 Sonia Seymour Mikich, German journalist

Serbian surnames
Croatian surnames